Storie may refer to
Storie (surname)
Storie index, a method of soil rating
Tutte storie, an album by Italian singer Eros Ramazzotti